The International Regional Science Review is a peer-reviewed academic journal that covers the field of regional science. The journal's editors-in-chiefs are Alan T. Murray and Tony H. Grubesic (Drexel University). It was established in 1975 and is currently published by SAGE Publications.

Abstracting and indexing 
International Regional Science Review is abstracted and indexed in Scopus and the Social Sciences Citation Index. According to the Journal Citation Reports, its 2017 impact factor is 1.75, ranking it 19 out of 40 journals in the category "Urban Studies", 28 out of 57 journals in the category "Planning & Development", and 65 out of 108 journals in the category "Environmental Studies".

References

External links 
 

SAGE Publishing academic journals
English-language journals
Environmental studies journals
Quarterly journals
Publications established in 1975
Urban studies and planning journals